John David Grant (born June 28, 1950) is a former American football defensive tackle in the National Football League (NFL), playing seven seasons with the Denver Broncos. 

Born and raised in Boise, Idaho, Grant graduated from its Capital High School and played college football at the University of Southern California in Los Angeles under head coach John McKay. In his senior season in 1972, the Trojans were undefeated and consensus national champions. Grant was first-team All-Pac-8 in 1971 and 1972, and a first-team All-American in 1972.

Grant was among ten Trojans selected in the 1973 NFL Draft, taken in the seventh round by Denver.  He was part of the Bronco's Orange Crush defense in 1977 which led the team to Super Bowl XII; it was the franchise's first appearance in the postseason.

References

External links
 

1950 births
Living people
Sportspeople from Boise, Idaho
Players of American football from Idaho
American football defensive tackles
American football defensive ends
USC Trojans football players
Denver Broncos players